Karoophasma botterkloofense is a species of insect in the family Mantophasmatidae. It is endemic to Northern Cape Province, South Africa, in a restricted area that encompasses the Botterkloof Pass and the settlement Calvinia.

References

Mantophasmatidae
Insects of South Africa
Endemic fauna of South Africa